Agonopterix chrautis is a moth in the family Depressariidae. It was described by Ronald W. Hodges in 1974. It is found in North America, where it has been recorded from Alberta to New Mexico and California.

References

Moths described in 1974
Agonopterix
Moths of North America